Maximum Choppage is an Australian television comedy series starring Lawrence Leung. The six-part series premiered in 2015 on ABC2. It is directed by Craig Melville and written by Leung, Duncan Sarkies and Josh Mapleston. It is produced by Julie Eckersley, Sophie Miller and Linda Micsko with executive producers Tony Ayres and Debbie Lee. The series is based on the film work of Timothy Ly which was developed into the TV series by Matchbox Pictures.

Plot
Simon Chan has returned to his hometown of Cabramatta. Whilst everyone thinks he was studying at a legendary martial arts school in Beijing, the truth is he was at Marshall's Art School, in Melbourne. Skilful with a paintbrush but clueless in combat, Simon is the exact opposite of an action hero. However, due to his mother’s boasting, everyone in Cabramatta thinks he is a kung fu master and the new saviour of their town.

Cast

 Lawrence Leung as Simon Chan 
 Dave Eastgate as Egg
 Stephanie Son as Petal
 Darren Gilshenan as Mayor Crawford 
 Georgina Haig as Elle
 Jason Chong as Pump'd
 Anthony Brandon Wong as Le Bok
 Andy Trieu as Fury
 Felino Dolloso as Kai Le 
 Kathryn Yuen as Mother

Episodes

Season 1 (2015)

See also
List of Australian television series
List of programs broadcast by ABC Television

References

External links

 TV Shows to add to your must-watch list in 2015
  Junkee - Top Ten Shows To Look Forward To This Year
  Lawrence Leung Website - Maximum Choppage Begins Shooting
 Maximum Choppage Preview Video
 Junkee Lawrence Leung Save Cabramatta with awkward Kung Fu in First Trailer of his brand new show
 Girls of Maximum Choppage Trailer
 Asian Movies Article
  'ABC comedy kung fu series Maximum Choppage packs a punch' - Fairfield Advance
 Director's webpage
 Campaign Brief Article
 'Music's Answer to Flight of the Conchords' TheMusic.com
 'When Asians Attack' The Monthly
 'Maximum Choppage star Lawrence Leung fights in Whackedout Kung Fu Universe' The Sydney Morning Herald
  'Maximum Choppage is winner for ABC' Sydney Morning Herald
  'Maximum Choppage: Pretending to be a fighter is really an art' The Australian
  Maximum Choppage gives Lawrence Leung maximum licence to goof off' The Sydney Morning Herald
 'TUESDAY'S PICK: Maximum Choppage' TV Week Logie Awards

2015 Australian television series debuts
Australian Broadcasting Corporation original programming
Australian comedy television series
Martial arts television series
Television series by Matchbox Pictures